Paul Charles Caravello (July 12, 1950 – November 24, 1991), better known professionally as Eric Carr, was an American musician who was the drummer for the rock band Kiss from 1980 to 1991. Caravello was selected as the new Kiss drummer after Peter Criss departed, when he chose the stage name "Eric Carr" and took up The Fox persona. He remained a member of Kiss until his death from heart cancer on November 24, 1991, at the age of 41.

Early life 
Born as Paul Charles Caravello on July 12, 1950, to Albert and Connie Caravello, Carr was of Italian descent. He grew up in the Brownsville section of Brooklyn in New York City. Because his father worked most of the time, Carr didn't see that much of him, and "never went to a baseball game or that kind of stuff" with his father. He spent a lot of time alone in his room, playing with toy soldiers and toy monsters.

Caravello attended the High School of Art and Design. He planned at first to be a cartoonist, then changed his mind quickly thereafter and decided to study photography. According to him, he ended up wasting "absolutely every day of high school. I got no work done, did nothing to further my career, wasted time, and wound up getting drunk in the darkroom with my friends all the time. We never got caught because we could see through the one-way glass whenever a teacher would come. It wasn't like I was getting drunk every day, you know. Half a cup of vodka in those days was enough to get you drunk." However, he has described himself as overall "a real good kid. I didn't do anything to make trouble."

Caravello was one of only two students in his high school who had long hair, mostly due to his love of the Beatles. He recalled that "I used to Dippity-Do my hair down, to make it stay flat. I used to have a Beatles haircut, but my hair's curly, so I couldn't get it to lay flat like the Beatles'. So I'd get the stuff Dippity-Do, drench my hair with it, and I'd take a piece of my Mom's nylon stocking, tie a knot in one end, and pull it over my head like a burglar. I was sleeping like that for probably two years with that on my head every night."

Caravello graduated from high school in 1967. At around that time, riots started to occur in New York City, followed by white flight that started to make his neighborhood more predominantly African-American. Caravello stated that this was not a real concern to him, because "I never had any problems with anybody, I had black friends, and I never grew up thinking in those kinds of terms.".

Early career 

While still in high school, Caravello began playing with a string of bands mostly performing covers of Top 40 songs. As he described it later, "Top-40 in those days was everything – funk, ballads, rock, country, and everything. It was a great time for radio." His first band, The Cellarmen, was formed in 1965 by him and several of his friends. They started playing local clubs in Brooklyn and Queens. Only a handful of recordings were released on the Jody Records label, a small Brooklyn recording studio. Caravello then joined a band called Things That Go Bump in the Night and later Smack, the latter of which consisted mostly of members from The Cellarmen, who disbanded in 1968.

Caravello joined the band Salt & Pepper in 1970, which started as a cover band playing music from multiple genres; the band was named that because half of the members were black and half were white. In 1973 the band changed their name to Creation, now performing disco music.

In 1974 a fire broke out during a discothèque gig at Gulliver's nightclub in Port Chester, New York, killing dozens of people including the band's keyboardist and lead singer. Caravello escaped and was credited with saving another person, one of the band's female singers. It was determined that the fire had been started by a thief in an adjacent building hoping to cover his tracks.

The band continued on, sometimes under the name Bionic Boogie. They held a benefit to replace their ruined equipment. Carr would go on with the band until 1979. They enjoyed some success, performing as an opening act for established names such as Stevie Wonder and Nina Simone. The band broke up in late 1979. He later described the band as "like my family basically for nine years."

In December 1979, Caravello successfully auditioned for a four-piece rock 'n' roll cover band called Flasher. After three weeks of rehearsals, they started playing at clubs. At this point he had become discouraged about his musical future after so many years trying to make it without a break, and considered settling down with a non-musical career. "...we were making real (lousy) money – something like $10, $7 a night, whatever it was it was. Really, really terrible. Just by contrast, I used to make $15 a night when I was like 16 years old, and here I am almost 30 years old, and I'm making like $7 a night! So I wasn't doing better, obviously – I was going in reverse, you know!

Flasher played the club circuit in New York City and Long Island for several months, before their keyboard player, Paul Turino quit; they then continued as a power trio, with the three sharing vocal duties. They played songs by Joe Jackson, Van Halen, Led Zeppelin and Jimi Hendrix, among others." Bookings diminished, and Caravello handed in his resignation in May 1980. At that point, he considered quitting music, having reached the age of 30 without any real success. Shortly afterwards, he had a chance meeting with Turino in a club in Queens; Turino told Caravello about Peter Criss' departure from Kiss, and urged Caravello to audition to become Kiss' drummer.

Kiss

Audition 
Caravello applied for Kiss, submitting a cassette tape of Kiss' current single "Shandi" but with his vocals over the music instead of Paul Stanley's vocals. "It sounded great!" he enthused years later. The application was put into a bright orange folder to make it stand out visually. Jane Grod, a Kiss staffer, told him later she had noticed the brightly colored envelope and so picked it to be one reviewed from the pile.

While sitting outside the room used for the audition, Caravello watched the three members of Kiss – Ace Frehley, Gene Simmons and Stanley – walk by to enter the room. He was one of the few people outside of the band's circle of friends, family and music business partners, to see Kiss without make-up. "Paul, I knew right away", he told a fanzine in 1990. "The others I wasn't sure about."

Caravello was the last drummer to audition for the band and asked Stanley, Simmons and Frehley to autograph the list of Kiss songs he was to play with the band, in case he never saw them again. "But I knew I had it", he told a fanzine in 1990. According to Caravello, his audition was videotaped. He was also immediately comfortable, feeling the songs he had to play "...were a snap." He knew the arrangements better than the band did, from learning the recorded versions off Kiss' albums. "They had been on tour, and changed little things around," he said. He was not impressed with Kiss' performance at the audition. "They were awful!" he emphasized, "I had to remind them, "'No, I sing this harmony, you sing that one', stuff like that. It was great! Right away we were working together. I know it impressed them."

A significant advantage for Caravello may have been his relative anonymity, as it was important for the band to maintain the mystique surrounding the members. Said Paul Stanley, "It was really important to us that we got somebody who was unknown... We didn't want somebody who last week was in Rod Stewart's band or in Rainbow." The press release announcing the induction of Caravello into Kiss deducted three years from his actual age in part to confuse those seeking information about his true identity, but also to help create an identification with Caravello – a young fan chosen out of the crowd to be the new Kiss drummer.

Stage makeup and persona 

After Caravello passed the audition, time was short but the band had some trouble coming up with a character persona and a stage name for him before his debut concert. "We never actually told him he was in the band," stated Paul Stanley on USA Network's Night Flight program in 1983, "We just said: "In two weeks we're playing.'"

Gene Simmons alleged that Carr wanted to use the stage name "Rusty Blade" until Simmons dissuaded him. He decided on "Eric Carr" quite carefully. He noticed that while the four members' full stage names were each three syllables long, Criss' name was the inverse of the other three band members' name syllable pattern – 'Peter Criss' was two syllables followed by a single syllable. He decided to make his stage name sound the same rhythmically as Peter Criss' by choosing a double syllable first name and a single syllable last name so when people said all four names together it would still fit the same to the ear. Carr was shortened from his birth name Caravello, and he chose Eric from a list of first names his girlfriend at the time had given him. Paul Caravello remained his legal name.

For his Kiss persona, Carr initially tried "The Hawk"; this concept was apparently very difficult to realize in greasepaint – a suitable make-up design was never created, and the "Hawk" costume was a "bright orange yellow!" The idea was dropped after Paul Stanley mentioned that it looked like Big Bird. With the band on deadline (only two weeks before Carr's stage debut), Carr came up with the make-up design for the persona of "The Fox"; Simmons liked it and thus the character was born. The original design was modified within days of Carr's initial photo sessions and debut concert as a KISS member.

Carr was introduced to the public on an episode of the syndicated television youth show Kids Are People Too! filmed in late July 1980 and aired in September 1980. His first public performance was with the band in New York City's Palladium on July 25, 1980. His parents, warned to not tell anyone their son was in Kiss (to maintain the mystique that no one knew what the new member looked like without make up), attended the concert, and were recognized by a friend who worked with Carr at a repair shop – and had no idea the new Kiss member behind the kit was his former coworker. "'What are you doing here?'", Carr's father, Albert Caravello, related in the Tale of the Fox DVD, "'You like Kiss?' I said, "Yeah!'" Carr also, immediately after joining Kiss, still did a few stove repair jobs. For Christmas in 1980, the Kiss organization bought Carr a Porsche—so their new drummer would ride around in appropriate rock star-style. The car broke down often, and caused Carr quite a bit of grief.

His persona remained consistent for three years until the band's well-publicized removal of their stage makeup in September 1983, live on MTV. The drastic move came after declining album sales and a poorly attended US tour. Carr thought the band was coming to an end, but Kiss slowly turned their career descent into a rebound, and the band thrived. Carr earned a reputation amongst fans for being very friendly and approachable. He answered more mail than other band members, and often added messages to his autographs. Despite being a replacement of an original member, his popularity soared among fans based on his personality and percussion skills.

Tenure in Kiss 

Carr's first album with Kiss was 1981's Music from "The Elder", which marked a departure for the band toward a mystical art-rock direction. One of Carr's contributions to the album, "Under the Rose", is one of the few Kiss songs written in 6/8 time and featured a Gregorian chant-style chorus. Later, he would also have cowriter credits on "All Hell's Breakin' Loose", "Under the Gun", and "No, No, No", amongst others. Carr said he found writing lyrics harder than writing music.

Besides drumming, Carr also played guitar, bass guitar and piano and sang background vocals. Occasionally he sang lead vocals, such as on "Black Diamond" and "Young and Wasted" live with Kiss. His first lead vocal in the studio was a re-recording of "Beth" (a song originally sung by Peter Criss) for the 1988 compilation album Smashes, Thrashes & Hits. Carr recorded his version of the song in the same room in the Record Plant where the song was originally recorded, using the same backing track as Criss.

In 1989, he recorded a demo with Kiss lead guitarist Bruce Kulick. Carr wrote the music, played bass and drums, while Kulick played guitar. As Carr was not a proficient lyricist, he presented the demo to Simmons with the words to Marvin Gaye's 1965 classic "Ain't That Peculiar". Simmons wrote new lyrics, which Carr recorded for the subsequent Hot in the Shade release. The song was released as "Little Caesar". He performed the song a few times, but it wasn't performed beyond the first month of the tour. Carr's last live performance with Kiss was November 9, 1990, in New York City, at Madison Square Garden.

As a replacement member, Carr was merely a paid employee with no vote unlike the four founding members who shared profits and voting rights equally. Through Carr's years in Kiss, his lower rank was a source of significant pain for him. He felt excluded and unfairly treated as a second-class Kiss citizen, for instance not being allowed to share Simmons' and Stanley's limousine, only getting minimal exposure in videos such as the Kiss eXposed VHS, or being partially cropped out of the Asylum album cover.  Unlike fellow bandmember Bruce Kulick with the same status, Carr grew ever more frustrated and unhappy, culminating in his feeling ditched by Kiss during his 1991 hospitalization. In his autobiography Peter Criss listed Carr as one of the people that Simmons and Stanley "drove mad": Carr "was reduced to sitting in his hotel room naked with the blinds all drawn, drinking and refusing to come out."

Carr's last recording with Kiss was for the song "God Gave Rock 'N' Roll to You II", which featured him on backing vocals. The last time Carr worked with Kiss was in July 1991 when Kiss filmed the video for "God Gave Rock 'N Roll to You" with Carr playing drums. Carr's last public appearance with the band was at the MTV Video Music Awards in September 1991.

Paul Stanley memoirs 
In his 2014 memoirs Face the Music: A Life Exposed, Kiss frontman Paul Stanley described Carr as a kind and talented, but troubled soul. Carr allegedly fixated on the fact that he was neither going to be a founding member of Kiss, nor the band's first drummer.  After having just met drummer Eric Singer and remaining insecure despite being in good standing with Kiss, Carr made the prescient claim that Singer was going to replace him as the new drummer in the band, which ultimately did occur in 1992 (after Carr's death).  For long periods, he would not even talk to Stanley. In his book, Stanley also recalls several memorable Carr episodes, including one in which he went out with a female photographer who later took nude photos of him in a bathtub holding a glass of champagne, claiming that the photographer had promised not to publish them (the photos were soon publicized in the journal with which the photographer was associated).

Influences and style 
Carr was a powerful hard-hitting drummer and one of the first drummers to adopt the classic 1980s snare drum sound: a highly reverberated and low-tuned sound. In his 1980 resume sent to Kiss, Carr stated that his drumming style ranged from heavy metal and hard rock to pop and new wave claiming that "I can adapt to most situations easily." He listed drummers John Bonham, Keith Moon and Lenny White as influences.

In addition, Carr was an avid fan of The Beatles and the band's drummer Ringo Starr. In an interview he recalled, "I was caught up in the whole Beatlemania thing. I guess I was attracted to the drums because of the feeling of the rhythm and how it moved you, just sitting in your seat. I loved the way Ringo moved. I identified with him at the time". Photographs of Carr during his high school years show him wearing his hair like Starr did.

Carr's interest in double bass drumming came from his admiration of Ginger Baker and John Bonham, once telling 16 magazine, "I just loved the way John Bonham played drums". Carr also had a love of all types of music; songwriter Adam Mitchell once described Carr as knowing a lot about folk, R&B and other non-rock styles. In a 1983 interview, Carr told USA Network interviewer Al Bandero that he listened to "a lot" of Neil Young, and liked many different types of music. Simmons has stated that Carr's harder drumming style pushed Kiss into becoming a heavier band than it had been when jazz-inspired Criss was the band's drummer.

Illness and death 
In February 1991, Carr began feeling ill. Medical tests initially revealed what appeared to be manageable health issues. However, further tests determined that he had heart cancer. In April 1991, Carr underwent a series of surgeries to remove tumors in his right atrium and lungs in an effort to restore heart function and prevent the cancer's growth. Soon after Carr's diagnosis, Paul Stanley and Gene Simmons replaced him with session drummer Eric Singer to commence new recordings for the band's upcoming album Revenge. After recovering from the multiple surgeries, Carr pressed Stanley and Simmons to let him back in the band. Stanley and Simmons refused; both have stated they repeatedly told Carr to focus on his cancer treatments and they would allow him to return to Kiss once he regained his health. By mid-1991, the band was preparing to shoot the music video for their upcoming single "God Gave Rock and Roll to You II". Despite his poor health, Carr asked Stanley and Simmons to allow him to be in the video. They ultimately agreed.

Carr flew to Los Angeles in July 1991. By that point, he had lost his hair due to chemotherapy treatments and was wearing a wig. After the video shoot, Carr flew back to New York to continue cancer treatments; his health had deteriorated to the point where he was unable to play drums for the recording sessions for Revenge. Carr's replacement, Eric Singer, played on the album's tracks.

Carr's last public appearance with Kiss was at the MTV Video Music Awards in September 1991. Not long afterwards, he suffered an aneurysm and was rushed to the hospital. Several days later, he suffered a brain hemorrhage and never regained consciousness. On November 24, 1991, Carr died at the age of 41. He died on the same day as Freddie Mercury, the lead singer of the British rock band Queen, whose death attracted more media attention. Carr had also been in a nearly four-year relationship with future model/actress Carrie Stevens at the time of his death.

In keeping with Carr's accessibility to his fans, his family decided to open his funeral service to the public while reserving the interment as a private event. Carr is interred in Cedar Hill Cemetery in the town of Newburgh, New York.

Although it was not publicised at the time, Carr's death was considered controversial amongst his family and Kiss. Both Paul Stanley and Gene Simmons were labeled the "bad guys" by Carr for booting him out of the band and not supporting him in his time of need. The two were not made aware of this until they attended his funeral and were treated with hostility by Carr's family and friends. Stanley wrote in his autobiography that, at the time, he believed the allegation of mistreating Carr was simply untrue and that he did what he thought was right to support him. However, during Carr's service, Stanley admitted to "sobbing uncontrollably" and came to regret how he had treated Carr during his illness.

Legacy and accolades

Rockology and Rockheads and Unfinished Business 
Former Kiss guitarist Bruce Kulick, along with Carr's family, released Carr's first and only solo album in 1999, titled Rockology, which featured many demos that Kulick and Carr worked on together (along with songwriter and friend Adam Mitchell). The CD features several songs with Carr on lead vocals as well as on bass guitar, along with Kulick on guitars and Mitchell assisting Carr with many of the background vocals. This album includes "Somebody's Waiting" and "Tiara", a song that he originally wrote for his planned children's cartoon show called Rockheads, a rock band parody featuring four characters (Slider, Clive, Scruffy and Punky) with different characteristics and personalities. Carr is a relative of skater Perry Caravello, star of the cult film classic Windy City Heat. Carr's family had published one of his unreleased albums called Unfinished Business in 2011,the album consists of 18 songs and being 43 minutes. The album has Carr's audition song Shandi.

Tributes 
As a tribute, the group's 1992 release Revenge featured what is said to be the only drum solo Carr ever recorded with the band, entitled "Carr Jam 1981", a jam session recorded for the Music From "The Elder" sessions (former Kiss guitarist Ace Frehley's original guitar part was overdubbed by Bruce Kulick). Much of the soloing was seasoned during Kiss' 1980 Unmasked Tour of Europe and Australia, and put down during the Music From "The Elder" sessions. Carr had for years been trying to get his hands on a copy of the solo for his personal collection, but his request was always rebuffed by Bob Ezrin with the excuse that he did not know where the masters for the session were. After Carr's death, the solo surfaced as "Carr Jam 1981".

The Revenge album was dedicated to Carr. He was also paid homage on the "Kiss My Ass" and Kissology 2 videos. However, the band declined a tribute concert that was requested by a circle of fans the year after his death. Simmons stated, "We didn't want to do a tribute concert. We are dedicating the album to his name, but no concerts in his name. It's not our style."

A further tribute was produced in 1992 called Eric Carr: The Memorial Tribute. It was first broadcast live on 88.1 FM / WCWP, where Carr had been interviewed three years earlier while doing press for the Hot in the Shade album. Running for approximately three hours, the tribute featured a re-broadcast of the interview, interspersed with biographical information and details of Carr's extracurricular projects, along with all the officially released songs Carr had written or cowritten. Though broadcast just once, Eric Carr: The Memorial Tribute was released several years later (seemingly in an unofficial capacity) as a two-tape box set, designed to resemble the Kiss solo albums. It featured a newly commissioned painting of Carr in his fox makeup, patterned after the rarely seen original by Eraldo Carugati (the artist who did the paintings for the original four Kiss solo album covers, plus one of Carr that was never officially released).

On numerous solo tours since Carr's death, Frehley would play "Breakout" (with lyrics written by Carr and Frehley and later re-recorded as "Carr Jam '81" on Kiss' Revenge album) and dedicate it to Carr, who Frehley hopes is "checking out the show up there". Frehley also dedicated his 2009 solo album Anomaly to Carr.

There is a hidden "easter egg" in the 2007 Kissology II DVD collection (on disc three at the end of the production credits) showing a family videotape made of Carr, on his hospital bed, speaking into the camera thanking his fans for their cards, letters, and concern about his health. Dressed in white, Carr then exits the bed, and begins walking away only to return and moon the camera in rock n' roll style.

On March 21, 2011, a book that explored Carr's entire life and musical career was released, titled The Eric Carr Story.

On August 13, 2011, to commemorate the 20th anniversary of Carr's death, a tribute concert was held in Atlanta, Georgia called Night of the Fox: The Eric Carr Tribute Concert. The main act, going under the name Little Caesar, played a 90-minute set of songs related to Carr. Made up mostly of Kiss songs from Carr's time in the band, the show also featured a song from Rockology ("Eyes of Love") plus songs written or co-written by Carr but recorded by other artists, such as "Don't Leave Me Lonely", a song recorded by Bryan Adams which was written by Carr for inclusion on Creatures of the Night album, but was rejected. Also, a tribute album featuring never released songs and interviews called Unfinished Business was released by his family. The album featured members and former members of Kiss, Twisted Sister, Seether, ZO2, Europe. The album was released on November 8, 2011.

Fifteen years to the day of Carr's Kiss debut, he was posthumously inducted into the Rock Walk Hall of Fame at Guitar Center in Hollywood. Carr's parents, Albert and Connie Caravello, accepted a plaque in Carr's honor. Former Kiss guitarist Ace Frehley was inducted in the "Rock Walk" during the same ceremony. Frehley's handprint was not added to the Kiss display. Carr's acknowledgment was a bronze plaque with his name, autograph and a separate icon of the Fox makeup he wore. Both were added to the Kiss display.

In July 2005, Carr was voted the tenth best drummer of all time by Planet Rock. No other member of Kiss was given the distinction of making the top ten in the categories of vocalist, bassist or guitarist. Carr was one of only two American drummers to make the list, with all others being either British or Canadian.

Discography

With Kiss 
1981: Music from "The Elder"
1982: Killers – compilation album featuring 4 newly recorded tracks
1982: Creatures of the Night
1983: Lick It Up
1984: Animalize
1985: Asylum
1987: Crazy Nights
1988: Chikara
1988: Smashes, Thrashes & Hits – compilation album featuring 2 newly recorded tracks, vocals on "Beth" remake, drum overdubs
1989: Hot in the Shade
1992: Revenge – backing vocals on "God Gave Rock 'N' Roll to You II", drums on "Carr Jam 1981"
1996: You Wanted the Best, You Got the Best!! – drums on "New York Groove"
2001: The Box Set
2002: The Very Best of Kiss
2004: The Best of Kiss, Volume 2: The Millennium Collection
2005: Gold

Kiss video albums 
1985: Animalize Live Uncensored
1987: Exposed
1988: Crazy Nights
1994: Kiss My Ass: The Video
2007: Kissology Volume Two: 1978–1991

Solo 
1999: Rockology
2011: Unfinished Business

Other albums 
1979: Lightning (Lightning) – backing vocals and drums on all tracks
1983: Bryan Adams (Cuts Like a Knife) – cowrote "Don't Leave Me Lonely"
1984: Wendy O. Williams (WOW) – cowrote "Ain't None of Your Business", drums on "Legends Never Die"
1987: Frehley's Comet (Frehley's Comet) – cowrote "Breakout"
1998: Garbo Talks (Garbo Talks) – drums on "Game of Love"
2000: Various artists (Prophecy: A Tribute to Eric Carr) – drums on "Your Turn to Cry"
2008: Faith Circus (Faith Circus) – cowrote "Can You Feel It"

Unreleased recordings 
Carr's family announced in 2006 that they would release material written and recorded by Carr between 1980 and 1991, including the following songs:
"Elephant Man"
"Dial L for Love"
"Midnight Stranger"
"Tiara" (Demo)
"The Troubles Inside You"

Though stated by Carr's family that the recordings would be released in 2006, they remain unreleased as of 2022. Some of the songs were released on the 2011 album, Unfinished Business, while others wound up on Rockology.

References

External links 

Introducing the Rockheads

Eric Carr Photo Gallery & Information Centre

1950 births
1991 deaths
20th-century American drummers
American heavy metal drummers
American male drummers
American rock drummers
American people of Italian descent
Deaths from cancer in New York (state)
Deaths from heart cancer
High School of Art and Design alumni
Kiss (band) members
Musicians from Brooklyn
People from Brownsville, Brooklyn
20th-century American male musicians